The 2003–04 New York Islanders season was the 32nd season in the franchise's history.

Offseason
Head coach Peter Laviolette was fired on June 3, 2003, and replaced by Bridgeport Sound Tigers head coach Steve Stirling.

Regular season

Final standings

Playoffs

Schedule and results

Regular season

|- align="center" bgcolor="#FFBBBB"
|1||L||October 9, 2003||1–6 || align="left"| @ Washington Capitals (2003–04) ||0–1–0–0 || 
|- align="center" bgcolor="#CCFFCC"
|2||W||October 11, 2003||6–0 || align="left"| @ Buffalo Sabres (2003–04) ||1–1–0–0 || 
|- align="center"
|3||T||October 14, 2003||2–2 OT|| align="left"| @ Atlanta Thrashers (2003–04) ||1–1–1–0 || 
|- align="center" bgcolor="#CCFFCC"
|4||W||October 18, 2003||2–1 || align="left"|  Florida Panthers (2003–04) ||2–1–1–0 || 
|- align="center" bgcolor="#CCFFCC"
|5||W||October 20, 2003||5–2 || align="left"|  Toronto Maple Leafs (2003–04) ||3–1–1–0 || 
|- align="center" bgcolor="#FFBBBB"
|6||L||October 23, 2003||0–3 || align="left"| @ Montreal Canadiens (2003–04) ||3–2–1–0 || 
|- align="center" bgcolor="#CCFFCC"
|7||W||October 25, 2003||7–2 || align="left"|  Pittsburgh Penguins (2003–04) ||4–2–1–0 || 
|- align="center" bgcolor="#FFBBBB"
|8||L||October 28, 2003||0–4 || align="left"|  New Jersey Devils (2003–04) ||4–3–1–0 || 
|- align="center"
|9||T||October 29, 2003||4–4 OT|| align="left"| @ Pittsburgh Penguins (2003–04) ||4–3–2–0 || 
|-

|- align="center" bgcolor="#CCFFCC"
|10||W||November 1, 2003||4–1 || align="left"|  Mighty Ducks of Anaheim (2003–04) ||5–3–2–0 || 
|- align="center" bgcolor="#CCFFCC"
|11||W||November 3, 2003||6–3 || align="left"|  Ottawa Senators (2003–04) ||6–3–2–0 || 
|- align="center" bgcolor="#CCFFCC"
|12||W||November 6, 2003||4–1 || align="left"|  Dallas Stars (2003–04) ||7–3–2–0 || 
|- align="center" bgcolor="#FFBBBB"
|13||L||November 8, 2003||3–4 || align="left"|  Atlanta Thrashers (2003–04) ||7–4–2–0 || 
|- align="center" bgcolor="#FFBBBB"
|14||L||November 11, 2003||1–2 || align="left"| @ Philadelphia Flyers (2003–04) ||7–5–2–0 || 
|- align="center" bgcolor="#CCFFCC"
|15||W||November 13, 2003||3–1 || align="left"|  Montreal Canadiens (2003–04) ||8–5–2–0 || 
|- align="center" bgcolor="#FFBBBB"
|16||L||November 15, 2003||3–4 || align="left"| @ Nashville Predators (2003–04) ||8–6–2–0 || 
|- align="center" bgcolor="#CCFFCC"
|17||W||November 19, 2003||4–1 || align="left"| @ Florida Panthers (2003–04) ||9–6–2–0 || 
|- align="center" bgcolor="#FFBBBB"
|18||L||November 20, 2003||2–3 || align="left"| @ Tampa Bay Lightning (2003–04) ||9–7–2–0 || 
|- align="center" bgcolor="#FFBBBB"
|19||L||November 22, 2003||1–2 || align="left"| @ Columbus Blue Jackets (2003–04) ||9–8–2–0 || 
|- align="center" bgcolor="#FFBBBB"
|20||L||November 26, 2003||0–2 || align="left"|  Carolina Hurricanes (2003–04) ||9–9–2–0 || 
|- align="center" bgcolor="#FFBBBB"
|21||L||November 28, 2003||0–6 || align="left"| @ Detroit Red Wings (2003–04) ||9–10–2–0 || 
|- align="center" bgcolor="#FFBBBB"
|22||L||November 29, 2003||1–5 || align="left"|  Philadelphia Flyers (2003–04) ||9–11–2–0 || 
|-

|- align="center" bgcolor="#FFBBBB"
|23||L||December 2, 2003||1–4 || align="left"|  Washington Capitals (2003–04) ||9–12–2–0 || 
|- align="center" bgcolor="#FFBBBB"
|24||L||December 4, 2003||2–4 || align="left"|  New York Rangers (2003–04) ||9–13–2–0 || 
|- align="center" bgcolor="#CCFFCC"
|25||W||December 6, 2003||5–2 || align="left"|  Chicago Blackhawks (2003–04) ||10–13–2–0 || 
|- align="center" bgcolor="#CCFFCC"
|26||W||December 9, 2003||5–2 || align="left"|  Tampa Bay Lightning (2003–04) ||11–13–2–0 || 
|- align="center" bgcolor="#FF6F6F"
|27||OTL||December 10, 2003||0–1 OT|| align="left"| @ New Jersey Devils (2003–04) ||11–13–2–1 || 
|- align="center" bgcolor="#CCFFCC"
|28||W||December 13, 2003||4–0 || align="left"|  Atlanta Thrashers (2003–04) ||12–13–2–1 || 
|- align="center" bgcolor="#CCFFCC"
|29||W||December 16, 2003||5–4 || align="left"|  New Jersey Devils (2003–04) ||13–13–2–1 || 
|- align="center" bgcolor="#FFBBBB"
|30||L||December 18, 2003||3–4 || align="left"| @ New York Rangers (2003–04) ||13–14–2–1 || 
|- align="center" bgcolor="#FFBBBB"
|31||L||December 20, 2003||1–3 || align="left"| @ Philadelphia Flyers (2003–04) ||13–15–2–1 || 
|- align="center" bgcolor="#CCFFCC"
|32||W||December 21, 2003||5–4 || align="left"| @ Washington Capitals (2003–04) ||14–15–2–1 || 
|- align="center" bgcolor="#CCFFCC"
|33||W||December 23, 2003||4–2 || align="left"|  Philadelphia Flyers (2003–04) ||15–15–2–1 || 
|- align="center" bgcolor="#CCFFCC"
|34||W||December 26, 2003||4–3 OT|| align="left"| @ New Jersey Devils (2003–04) ||16–15–2–1 || 
|- align="center" bgcolor="#CCFFCC"
|35||W||December 27, 2003||3–1 || align="left"|  Toronto Maple Leafs (2003–04) ||17–15–2–1 || 
|- align="center" bgcolor="#CCFFCC"
|36||W||December 29, 2003||3–1 || align="left"|  New Jersey Devils (2003–04) ||18–15–2–1 || 
|- align="center" bgcolor="#CCFFCC"
|37||W||December 31, 2003||6–1 || align="left"| @ Pittsburgh Penguins (2003–04) ||19–15–2–1 || 
|-

|- align="center" bgcolor="#FFBBBB"
|38||L||January 1, 2004||0–1 || align="left"| @ Ottawa Senators (2003–04) ||19–16–2–1 || 
|- align="center"
|39||T||January 3, 2004||3–3 OT|| align="left"| @ Boston Bruins (2003–04) ||19–16–3–1 || 
|- align="center" bgcolor="#FFBBBB"
|40||L||January 6, 2004||2–3 || align="left"|  Calgary Flames (2003–04) ||19–17–3–1 || 
|- align="center" bgcolor="#CCFFCC"
|41||W||January 8, 2004||3–2 || align="left"|  Edmonton Oilers (2003–04) ||20–17–3–1 || 
|- align="center" bgcolor="#FFBBBB"
|42||L||January 10, 2004||2–3 || align="left"|  New York Rangers (2003–04) ||20–18–3–1 || 
|- align="center" bgcolor="#FFBBBB"
|43||L||January 13, 2004||1–4 || align="left"| @ New York Rangers (2003–04) ||20–19–3–1 || 
|- align="center"
|44||T||January 15, 2004||4–4 OT|| align="left"| @ Ottawa Senators (2003–04) ||20–19–4–1 || 
|- align="center" bgcolor="#CCFFCC"
|45||W||January 17, 2004||4–2 || align="left"|  Buffalo Sabres (2003–04) ||21–19–4–1 || 
|- align="center" bgcolor="#CCFFCC"
|46||W||January 19, 2004||5–2 || align="left"|  Ottawa Senators (2003–04) ||22–19–4–1 || 
|- align="center" bgcolor="#FFBBBB"
|47||L||January 20, 2004||0–2 || align="left"| @ Toronto Maple Leafs (2003–04) ||22–20–4–1 || 
|- align="center" bgcolor="#CCFFCC"
|48||W||January 23, 2004||3–2 || align="left"| @ Carolina Hurricanes (2003–04) ||23–20–4–1 || 
|- align="center" bgcolor="#CCFFCC"
|49||W||January 24, 2004||3–0 || align="left"| @ Atlanta Thrashers (2003–04) ||24–20–4–1 || 
|- align="center"
|50||T||January 27, 2004||2–2 OT|| align="left"|  Boston Bruins (2003–04) ||24–20–5–1 || 
|- align="center" bgcolor="#FF6F6F"
|51||OTL||January 29, 2004||1–2 OT|| align="left"| @ Boston Bruins (2003–04) ||24–20–5–2 || 
|- align="center" bgcolor="#CCFFCC"
|52||W||January 31, 2004||4–2 || align="left"|  Florida Panthers (2003–04) ||25–20–5–2 || 
|-

|- align="center" bgcolor="#CCFFCC"
|53||W||February 3, 2004||5–4 OT|| align="left"|  Vancouver Canucks (2003–04) ||26–20–5–2 || 
|- align="center" bgcolor="#FFBBBB"
|54||L||February 5, 2004||1–2 || align="left"| @ Montreal Canadiens (2003–04) ||26–21–5–2 || 
|- align="center"
|55||T||February 10, 2004||1–1 OT|| align="left"| @ Colorado Avalanche (2003–04) ||26–21–6–2 || 
|- align="center"
|56||T||February 11, 2004||4–4 OT|| align="left"| @ Dallas Stars (2003–04) ||26–21–7–2 || 
|- align="center" bgcolor="#CCFFCC"
|57||W||February 13, 2004||5–2 || align="left"| @ Phoenix Coyotes (2003–04) ||27–21–7–2 || 
|- align="center"
|58||T||February 16, 2004||1–1 OT|| align="left"|  Los Angeles Kings (2003–04) ||27–21–8–2 || 
|- align="center" bgcolor="#CCFFCC"
|59||W||February 18, 2004||4–3 || align="left"|  Pittsburgh Penguins (2003–04) ||28–21–8–2 || 
|- align="center" bgcolor="#FFBBBB"
|60||L||February 19, 2004||2–6 || align="left"| @ New York Rangers (2003–04) ||28–22–8–2 || 
|- align="center" bgcolor="#CCFFCC"
|61||W||February 21, 2004||4–1 || align="left"|  Buffalo Sabres (2003–04) ||29–22–8–2 || 
|- align="center"
|62||T||February 24, 2004||0–0 OT|| align="left"|  Boston Bruins (2003–04) ||29–22–9–2 || 
|- align="center" bgcolor="#FFBBBB"
|63||L||February 26, 2004||3–6 || align="left"|  New York Rangers (2003–04) ||29–23–9–2 || 
|- align="center" bgcolor="#CCFFCC"
|64||W||February 27, 2004||4–2 || align="left"| @ Buffalo Sabres (2003–04) ||30–23–9–2 || 
|- align="center" bgcolor="#FF6F6F"
|65||OTL||February 29, 2004||2–3 OT|| align="left"|  Pittsburgh Penguins (2003–04) ||30–23–9–3 || 
|-

|- align="center"
|66||T||March 2, 2004||3–3 OT|| align="left"| @ Pittsburgh Penguins (2003–04) ||30–23–10–3 || 
|- align="center" bgcolor="#FFBBBB"
|67||L||March 4, 2004||2–6 || align="left"| @ Toronto Maple Leafs (2003–04) ||30–24–10–3 || 
|- align="center" bgcolor="#FFBBBB"
|68||L||March 6, 2004||2–4 || align="left"|  St. Louis Blues (2003–04) ||30–25–10–3 || 
|- align="center" bgcolor="#FF6F6F"
|69||OTL||March 9, 2004||2–3 OT|| align="left"| @ St. Louis Blues (2003–04) ||30–25–10–4 || 
|- align="center" bgcolor="#FFBBBB"
|70||L||March 11, 2004||4–5 || align="left"| @ San Jose Sharks (2003–04) ||30–26–10–4 || 
|- align="center" bgcolor="#CCFFCC"
|71||W||March 12, 2004||3–1 || align="left"| @ Mighty Ducks of Anaheim (2003–04) ||31–26–10–4 || 
|- align="center" bgcolor="#CCFFCC"
|72||W||March 16, 2004||3–1 || align="left"| @ Tampa Bay Lightning (2003–04) ||32–26–10–4 || 
|- align="center" bgcolor="#FFBBBB"
|73||L||March 17, 2004||4–6 || align="left"| @ Florida Panthers (2003–04) ||32–27–10–4 || 
|- align="center" bgcolor="#CCFFCC"
|74||W||March 19, 2004||3–1 || align="left"|  Minnesota Wild (2003–04) ||33–27–10–4 || 
|- align="center" bgcolor="#CCFFCC"
|75||W||March 21, 2004||3–0 || align="left"|  Tampa Bay Lightning (2003–04) ||34–27–10–4 || 
|- align="center" bgcolor="#CCFFCC"
|76||W||March 23, 2004||3–0 || align="left"|  Washington Capitals (2003–04) ||35–27–10–4 || 
|- align="center" bgcolor="#CCFFCC"
|77||W||March 25, 2004||4–2 || align="left"| @ Philadelphia Flyers (2003–04) ||36–27–10–4 || 
|- align="center" bgcolor="#FFBBBB"
|78||L||March 27, 2004||2–3 || align="left"|  Carolina Hurricanes (2003–04) ||36–28–10–4 || 
|- align="center" bgcolor="#FFBBBB"
|79||L||March 28, 2004||2–3 || align="left"| @ New Jersey Devils (2003–04) ||36–29–10–4 || 
|- align="center" bgcolor="#CCFFCC"
|80||W||March 31, 2004||5–1 || align="left"|  Montreal Canadiens (2003–04) ||37–29–10–4 || 
|-

|- align="center" bgcolor="#CCFFCC"
|81||W||April 2, 2004||6–4 || align="left"| @ Carolina Hurricanes (2003–04) ||38–29–10–4 || 
|- align="center"
|82||T||April 4, 2004||3–3 OT|| align="left"|  Philadelphia Flyers (2003–04) ||38–29–11–4 || 
|-

|-
| Legend:

Playoffs

|- align=center style="background:#FFBBBB;"
|1 || April 8|| New York Islanders || 0–3 || Tampa Bay Lightning || St. Pete Times Forum (18,536) || 0–1 || 
|- align=center style="background:#CCFFCC;"
|2 || April 10|| New York Islanders || 3–0 || Tampa Bay Lightning || St. Pete Times Forum (19,982) || 1–1 || 
|- align=center style="background:#FFBBBB;"
|3 || April 12|| Tampa Bay Lightning || 3–0 || New York Islanders || Nassau Veterans Memorial Coliseum (16,234) || 1–2 || 
|- align=center style="background:#FFBBBB;"
|4 || April 14|| Tampa Bay Lightning || 3–0 || New York Islanders || Nassau Veterans Memorial Coliseum (16,234) || 1–3 || 
|- align=center style="background:#FFBBBB;"
|5 || April 16|| New York Islanders || 2–3 OT || Tampa Bay Lightning || St. Pete Times Forum (20,927) || 1–4 || 
|-

|-
| Legend:

Player statistics

Scoring
 Position abbreviations: C = Center; D = Defense; G = Goaltender; LW = Left Wing; RW = Right Wing
  = Joined team via a transaction (e.g., trade, waivers, signing) during the season. Stats reflect time with the Islanders only.
  = Left team via a transaction (e.g., trade, waivers, release) during the season. Stats reflect time with the Islanders only.

Goaltending

Awards and records

Awards

Transactions
The Islanders were involved in the following transactions from June 10, 2003, the day after the deciding game of the 2003 Stanley Cup Finals, through June 7, 2004, the day of the deciding game of the 2004 Stanley Cup Finals.

Trades

Players acquired

Players lost

Signings

Draft picks
The Islanders' had 9 picks in the 2003 NHL Entry Draft, which was held at the Gaylord Entertainment Center in Nashville, Tennessee.

Draft notes
 The Edmonton Oilers' second-round pick (originally from the Washington Capitals) went to the New York Islanders as a result of a March 11, 2003 trade that sent Brad Isbister and Raffi Torres to the Oilers in exchange for Janne Niinimaa and this pick.
 The St. Louis Blues' second-round pick went to the New York Islanders as a result of a March 11, 2003 trade that sent Chris Osgood and a 2003 third-round pick to the Blues in exchange for Justin Papineau and this pick.
 The New York Islanders' third-round pick went to the St. Louis Blues as the result of a March 11, 2003 trade that sent Justin Papineau and a 2003 second-round pick to the Islanders in exchange for Chris Osgood and this pick.
 The New York Islanders' fifth-round pick went to the Florida Panthers as the result of a March 19, 2002 trade that sent Darren Van Impe to the Islanders in exchange for this pick.
 Compensatory pick received from NHL as compensation for Group III free agent Kip Miller.
 The New York Islanders' ninth-round pick went to the Florida Panthers as the result of an October 11, 2002 trade that sent Sven Butenschon to the Islanders in exchange for Juraj Kolnik and this pick.

See also
 2003–04 NHL season

Notes

References

 
 

New York Islanders seasons
New York Islanders
New York Islanders
New York Islanders
New York Islanders